David Prentice (29 July 1908 – 10 November 1984) was a Scottish professional footballer who played in the Football League for Mansfield Town and Walsall.

References

1908 births
1984 deaths
Scottish footballers
Association football forwards
English Football League players
Celtic F.C. players
Stranraer F.C. players
Ayr United F.C. players
Nithsdale Wanderers F.C. players
Plymouth Argyle F.C. players
Walsall F.C. players
AFC Bournemouth players
Raith Rovers F.C. players
Mansfield Town F.C. players
Bath City F.C. players
Trowbridge Town F.C. players
Alva Albion Rangers F.C. players